The  was an infantry division of the Imperial Japanese Army. It was formed 12 July 1944 in Hunchun as a triangular division. The nucleus for the formation was the remnants of the 28th Division been transferred to Miyako-jima. The division was initially assigned to the Third army.

Action
The garrison of the division was the Jiandao area. As the Soviet invasion of Manchuria has started 9 August 1945, it fought a desperate defensive battle meeting Red Army forces south and west of Hunchun while fighting the against Soviet "113th fortified sector" and 88th Rifle Corps. The division's resistance was described as "heavy", despite the estimate by the 1st Area Army that the 112th was only 35% combat effective. 11 August 1945, a frontal attack by the Soviet armour near Michiang was repulsed. The Hunchun itself was lost to Soviet forces 14 August 1945, after Red Army was forced to send in reinforcements in the form of 386th Rifle Division. Another Soviet attack supported by armour was beaten back 15 August 1945 at Unggidong. Although the next Soviet attack was expected at Pungni-ju city, 16 August 1945 all of the division's units were engaged by Red Army forces simultaneously. The unit was ordered to surrender 18 August 1945 as the part of the general surrender of Japan.

The majority of the division was then taken prisoner by the Soviet Union.

See also
 List of Japanese Infantry Divisions

Notes and references
This article incorporates material from Japanese Wikipedia page 第112師団 (日本軍), accessed 27 June 2016
 Madej, W. Victor, Japanese Armed Forces Order of Battle, 1937–1945 [2 vols], Allentown, PA: 1981.

Japanese World War II divisions
Infantry divisions of Japan
Military units and formations established in 1944
Military units and formations disestablished in 1945
1944 establishments in Japan
1945 disestablishments in Japan